Doctor Butcher was a side project involving Jon Oliva and Chris Caffery of Savatage which released one major self-titled studio album in 1994. The original album title, A Living Hell, was changed at the last minute.

The project was born when Oliva left Savatage at the conclusion of their 1991 tour in support of their album Streets: A Rock Opera. Caffery was invited to play with the band on tour, like he did in the support of their 1989 album Gutter Ballet, but this was not possible because of issues within Atlantic Records. After Caffery heard of Oliva's departure from the fore of the band, he called him, and "over ten bottles of Jack Daniels", Doctor Butcher was born.

Zachary Stevens replaced Oliva as lead vocalist for Savatage in 1993, but Jon continued to work with his brother Criss on the record which would eventually become Edge of Thorns. Caffery was again asked to re-join the band, but he stayed loyal to Jon and Doctor Butcher. Some initial demos were recorded with Hal Patino and Gene Barnett, but bad press over Oliva's health (he was still recovering from the drug and alcohol addiction he had during the late 80s and early 90s) lead Atlantic Records to make a decision between Doctor Butcher or Savatage and the label chose the latter.

Hopes of an American release were shattered. However, Doctor Butcher was picked up for a European release, and a self-titled album followed. Despite being let down by a non-US release, plans were made for a second record with the tentative title, The Good, The Bad, and the Butchered, to be released in January 1996. However, after Oliva and Caffery re-joined Savatage, the album saw a possible release date pushed to 1997 (a post on the Savatage website claimed that it may also have been released prior to the band's then forthcoming album, The Wake of Magellan). Due to a contractual obligation to Edel Records, the second album was eventually never released.

A compilation of the band's demos was released in 1999 by Crook Records. In 2005, Black Lotus Records re-issued the album with a bonus disc, featuring one new song ("Inspecter Highway") and four tracks taken from the demo CD.

Track listing

Personnel
 Jon Oliva – lead vocals, bass guitars, keyboards, producer
 Christopher Caffery – lead, rhythm and bass guitars, producer, mixing
 Johnny Osborn – drums, percussion

Additional musicians
 Hal Patino – bass guitar on tracks 2–5 of bonus CD
 Gene Barnett – drums on tracks 2–5 of bonus CD
 "Metal" Mike Chlasciak – guitar solo on "Inspecter Highway"
 David Z – bass guitar on "Inspecter Highway"
 Jeff Plate – drums on "Inspecter Highway"
 Paul Morris – piano on "Inspecter Highway"
 Dave Eggar – strings on "Inspecter Highway"

Production
Jim Morris – co–producer, engineer, mixing
Tom Morris – engineer, mixing
Steve Heritage, Mark Prator, Jeff MacDonald – assistant engineers
John Goldwater – executive producer
Nik Chinboukas – producer and engineer on "Inspecter Highway"

References

1994 albums
American heavy metal musical groups
GUN Records albums
Musical groups established in 1991
Savatage
1991 establishments in the United States
GUN Records artists